Dalibor Motejlek (born 17 April 1942) is a Czechoslovakian former ski jumper. Motejlek competed in the normal hill and large hill events at the 1964 Winter Olympics.

On 15 February 1964, he set the ski jumping world record distance at 142 metres (466 ft) on Heini-Klopfer-Skiflugschanze in Oberstdorf, West Germany.

References

External links
 

1942 births
Living people
Czech male ski jumpers
Olympic ski jumpers of Czechoslovakia
Ski jumpers at the 1964 Winter Olympics
People from Vysoké nad Jizerou
Sportspeople from the Liberec Region